Acrolepia conchitis is a moth of the  family Acrolepiidae. It was described by Edward Meyrick in 1913. It is found in India (Assam).

References

Moths described in 1913
Acrolepiidae